Najia Mehadji (born in 1950) is an artist of Franco-Moroccan heritage who lives and works between Paris, France and Essaouira, Morocco.

Biography 
Najia Mehadji is a French-Moroccan artist familiar on the Moroccan scene and recognized in France since the 1980s from exhibitions in major museums including the Centre Georges Pompidou in Paris.
She received in the mid-1970s a master of fine arts and art history degree at Pantheon-Sorbonne University and a theatrical degree from Paris 8 University. The latter led to her working with Peter Brook and The Living Theatre, avant-garde groups open to so-called "non-Europeans", creating a unique body work and influencing her own work with the development of her particular style.

During those years, she discovered the Japanese zen aesthetic and rituals Sufi Whirling Dervish, using charcoal or ink with great freedom. Then she created performances with students in contemporary music, drawing on large sheets of paper. She also joined the Women/Art group and published her first drawings, a kind of black and white diagrams that can be described as "sensitive abstraction".

In 1985 she spent a year at Essaouira with a scholarship "Villa Médicis Hors les murs" and regularly returns each year for several months. It was during this first stay she painted her series on the myth of Icarus, "symbol of the risk-taking freedom" on large raw canvases where the imprint of body gestures is juxtaposed with collages and transparent geometric shapes. The works were exhibited in her first solo exhibition in the art museums of Caen and Poitiers in 1986–87.

In 1993–1994, in response to war crimes committed against the Bosniaks in ex-Yugoslavia, she created a series of Domes as a result of her interest in "transcultural" architectural shapes (including the octagon), while making explicit reference to the representation of cosmology in the arts of Islam. In 2005, she returned to this drama with the Flower War; digital works which appear in "The Disasters of War" by Goya.

From 1996 to 2006, Mehadji drew on large canvases with intense color chalks oil paintings / drawings from monochrome symbolic themes such as the sphere, the tree (or tree of life), the flower of Granada, etc. She created so many "abstract flow structures" capturing both transience of life, the passage, the notion of infinity. Then she began to paint with a broad brush curved lines in "arabesque" white or red on black, and inventing an "inner writing" sensitive and sublime body and soul: the Scrolls.

In 1998, she taught drawing as a visiting professor at the École nationale supérieure des Beaux-Arts (National School of Fine Arts) of Paris.

Alongside painting and drawing, since 2005, she has continued her commitment against violence in the Middle East, creating digital works incorporating enlarged details of Goya engravings (including La Tauromaquia and  The Disasters of War ) within fluorescent flower designs – "as a tension between Eros and Thanatos".

Since 2008, she has created a new series of large-format paintings and digital images that give a sculptural aspect to her actions with Swirls, Arabesque, Mystic Dance, Coil whose continuous lines, free gestures and references to oriental calligraphy and Sufism are all formal proposals allowing her to adopt practices usually attributed to men by inventing a new approach to painting, liberated from tradition and resembling performance.

Exhibitions 
Her main personal exhibitions were held in France, the Museums of Fine Arts of Poitiers of Caen and Epinal; the Montenay Gallery (Paris); at the St. John hall (Mairie de Paris); the gallery The Ship (Brest). In Morocco, at the National Gallery Bab Ruach (Rabat); Actua space in the Attijariwafabank (Casablanca); the Delacroix Gallery (Tanger); the Shart Gallery and Atelier 21 (Casablanca). In Qatar, with the Anima Gallery in Doha. She also explained to Amman (Shoman Foundation) at the fair in Basel, with the Arco Madrid, the FI:AF (French Institute Alliance Française) in New York and many institutions worldwide.

She participated in 2009 in the exhibition  at the Musée National d'Art Moderne (Paris) and  Crossing  during the Mawazine Festival (Rabat).

In 2010, at the Contemporary Art Fair in Dubai, at the exhibition  Resonances  the Marrakech museum and to Marrakech Art Fair as part of the Shart gallery of Casablanca.

In 2011, in the group exhibition 'Architectures / Drawings / Utopias' 'at the National Museum of Romanian Contemporary Art in' 'Nature and Landscapes' at the art space of the General Company of Casablanca, and Drawing Now Paris at the Carrousel du Louvre. Then she exposes in 'Sense & Essences' at the New York French Institute (FI: AF) and Villa Roosevelt to Casablanca his series  Mystic Dance .
It is one of these artists Traits d'Union – Paris and contemporary Arab art  at Villa Emerige in Paris: museum exhibition that brings together a dozen Arab artists have a special relationship with France, and whose success is such that it, through the French Institute, is traveling in 2012–2013 (Beirut, Sana'a, Rabat, etc.)

In 2012–2013, she exhibited at the Galerie Shart, Casablanca,  Close  at the Galerie Albert Benamou in Paris and Art Paris Art Fair, then Anima Gallery in Doha (Qatar). She participates in 25 years of Arab creativity at the Institut du Monde Arabe, Emirates Palace in Abu Dhabi and Manama in Bahrain. His solo exhibitions in 2013 are:  Mystic Dance  at Espace Art Roch (Paris),  The 2000  at the Espace Claude Lemand (Paris),  draping  at the gallery The Ship (Brest).
She participates in the auction  Syriart  in Paris and Beirut to support the civilian victims of the Syrian people in revolt.

Early 2014 she made a solo exhibition "New Arabesque" at the Galerie Le Violon Bleu in Tunis and at Art Dubai (Selma Feriani Gallery London) and at Art Paris Art Fair (gallery Lemand Claude Paris). In summer 2014, his series of digital works  Suites Goyesques; Bullfighting  are shown in the Musée d'Art Moderne de Céret in  The painter and the arena and bullfighting art from Goya to Barceló  Then she participated in the inaugural exhibition of the  Rabat "Art 1914–2014,100ans in Morocco," as well as that of the Arab World Institute in Paris " the Contemporary Morocco ". In March 2015 she exhibited "20 years of work" at the gallery Atelier 21 in Casablanca that organizes her first retrospective in Morocco and at Art Paris Art Fair at the Grand Palace in the gallery Claude Lemand.

The works of Najia Mehadji are present in many public collections and museums, including the Centre Georges Pompidou MNAM (4 large drawings and a painting on paper) and the Arab World Institute in Paris (paint) and in collections Société Générale, the ONA Foundation, the Mohammed VI Museum of Modern and Contemporary Art of Rabat and Casablanca Attijari Waffabank who own many works.
Several videos about the artist can be seen on YouTube.

See also

References

Bibliography 
  Najia Mehadji  Edition Somogy, 2008. Texts Alain Tapie, Christine Buci-Glucksmann, Jean-Louis Baudry, Mohamed Rachdi and Henri-François Debailleux. 160 pages, French / English texts, 130 color illustrations.
 Review  star ink n°42, 2010, "Celebration", interview with Peggy Ines Sultan
  Monograph Najia Mehadji  Les Éditions Art Point, collection Moroccan Art Books, 2012: texts of Pascal Amel, Rémi Labrusse Veronique Rieffel, Christine Buci-Glucksmann, Ghitha Triki, Philippe Piguet, Anne Dagbert, Peggy Ines Sultan Mohamed Rachdi, Henri-François Debailleux. 280 pages, 10 French / English texts, 330 color illustrations.
  The revelation of gesture,  Edition Somogy, 2011 Pascal Amel texts, Veronique Rieffel, Abdelwahab Meddeb, Rémi Labrosse etChristine Buci-Glucksmann. 160 pages, French / English texts.

External links 
 
 Video made on the occasion of the exhibition "Facing History: Mahi Binebine / Najia Mehadji" to MACMA (Museum of Contemporary Art Marrakech), in March 2016 by Brigitte Huault-Delannoy
 Podcast of the show "Cultures of Islam" on France Culture interview with Abdelwahab Meddeb of 1 November 2013, "Painting between Mogador and Ivry" (58 min)
 Issue Podcast "Tuesdays of the exhibition" on France Culture, interview with Elizabeth Couturier of 3 May 2011, "The museum staff Najia Mehadji" (58 min)

French women painters
French contemporary artists
Moroccan contemporary artists
1950 births
Living people
21st-century French women artists
20th-century French women